Dwayne Cameron (born 28 October 1981) is a New Zealand actor, writer, director and producer. Cameron is best known internationally for playing the lead roles of Bray on the teen drama series The Tribe and Tyzonn in Power Rangers Operation Overdrive.

Biography

Born in Auckland, New Zealand, Cameron began painting and sculpting at the age of 6 years old. He began acting professionally at 12 when he appeared in a nationally syndicated commercial for Hidden Valley Ranch Dressing. Within three years, he had landed his first role in the American television movie Amazon High where Cameron played the boyfriend of Selma Blair. Two years later, he guest starred alongside William Shatner in A Twist in the Tale. The series was produced in Wellington by Cloud Nine, the same company who would cast him in the lead role for its next project The Tribe.

He remained on the show for the first three series and left to pursue other TV and film work. He is one of the stars scheduled to make a return for the show's sixth series, however the show was canceled before it could go into production. During his time on the series, he went on several publicity tours to Europe to promote both the show and the spin-off album Abe Messiah. He also represented The Tribe when it was a nominated for best international television drama at the 2000 GAIT Awards in Los Angeles.

After The Tribe Cameron made guest appearances in numerous television dramas including Love Bites and Dark Knight. He also had lead roles in Street Legal and the award-winning Mercy Peak during the next two years. He also had starring roles in The Possum Hunter (2000), The Locals (2003) and Cockle (2005).

In 2004, he moved to Los Angeles where he trained at the Stella Adler Academy and the Ivana Chubbuck Acting Studio. He also bought art studios in Los Angeles and Auckland. Signing a contract with Scott Karp and the Syndicate Agency, then based in Universal Studios, Cameron appeared in the 2007 film No Destination with Brianna Brown and John Savage and also played the love interest of Amber Heard in a Warner Brothers music video. He returned to New Zealand where he landed starring roles in Power Rangers Operation Overdrive, Shortland Street, The Cult, and Legend Of The Seeker.

In 2009 Cameron launched an official website highlighting his other talents as a screenwriter, film director, producer and fine arts painter and sculptor. Recent works include playing the lead role of Detective Joshua King in the New Zealand feature film Desired, the lead role in A Dream a short film made with the assistance of Oscar and Palme d'Or winner Jane Campion, and is based on Franz Kafka's The Trial. He also played the lead role in Holding the Sun, a short film based on the works of C.G. Jung and Joseph Campbell, that he wrote, directed, produced and edited. Holding the Sun was nominated for Best Short Film and Best Production Design at the 2013 New Zealand Film Awards and was selected into the Cannes Film Festival in the Short Film Corner the same year.

Filmography

Film
 One of Them (1998) as Rusty
 The Locals (2003) as Paul
 Cockle (2005, Short) as Cockle
 No Destination (2006, Short) as Troy
 The Puzzle (2010, Short) as Josh
 Vindaloo Empire (2010)
 Curry Munchers (2011) as Connor
 Desired (2011) as Detective Joshua King
 A Dream (2012, Short) as Accused
 The Last Stop (2012, Short) as Station Master
 Pleroma (2013, Short) as Abraxas 'Mach' Machelvie
 Holding the Sun (2013, Short) as Matthew Archview
 Broken Hallelujah (2014) as TV Assistant
 Nice Package (2016) as Frostie
 McLaren (2017, Documentary) as Bruce McLaren
 211 (2018) as Steve MacAvoy
 Disturbing the Peace (2020) as Diesel
 June (2021, Short) as David

TV work
 Amazon High (1997, TV Movie) as Leon
 A Twist in the Tale (1999) as Chris
 The Tribe (1999–2002) as Bray
 Possum Hunter (2000, TV Movie) as Rob
 Dark Knight (2002) as Mordred
 Love Bites (2002) as Barman John
 Mercy Peak (2002–2003) as Gus Van der Velter
 Street Legal (2002-2003) as James Peabody
 Power Rangers Dino Thunder (2004) as Derrick
 Power Rangers S.P.D. (2005) as Dru Harrington / Giganis
 Power Rangers Operation Overdrive (2007) as Tyzonn / Mercury Ranger
 Shortland Street (2008) as Lindsay Reynolds
 Legend of the Seeker (2009) as Kur
 The Cult (2009) as Nathan Lewis
 Emilie Richards (2011) as Schwarzhaariger Brandstifter
 Cancerman: The Milan Brych Affair (2012, TV Movie documentary) as Dr. Garth Cooper
 Strongman: The Tragedy (2012, Documentary) as Peter Crawford
 Mr & Mrs Murder (2013) as Ryan Coltrane
 Agent Anna (2014) as Rory O'Conner
 American Playboy: The Hugh Hefner Story (2017) as Counsellor Summerfield

References

External links
 
 

1981 births
New Zealand male film actors
New Zealand male television actors
Living people
Place of birth missing (living people)
New Zealand male soap opera actors
20th-century New Zealand male actors
21st-century New Zealand male actors